was a Japanese actor and voice actor from Gifu Prefecture. Gotō died on November 6, 2018, from esophageal cancer.

Filmography

Television animation
Master Keaton (1998) (Edward Langley (episode 6))
Cyborg 009 (2001) (Sukea)
Saikano (2002) (Kanbu)
Planetes (2003) (Arvind "Robbie" Lavie)
Gallery Fake (2005) (High priest)
Kage Kara Mamoru! (2006) (Jin Pan Jii)
Angel Heart (2006) (Chan)
Naruto (2006) (Kanna (episode 197))
Ōban Star-Racers (2006) (Lord Furter)
Death Note (2006) (Deridovely)
Zero no Tsukaima (2006) (Derflingher, Scarron)
Ancient Ruler Dinosaur King DKidz Adventure (2007) (Dr. Sonoida)
One Piece (2009) (Hannyabal, Saint Mjosgard, Lao G)
Nura: Rise of the Yokai Clan (2010) (Gangi Kozō)
Shinryaku! Ika Musume (2010) (Martin)
Shinryaku!? Ika Musume (2011) (Martin)
Hunter × Hunter (2013) (Bizeff)
Dragon Ball Super (2016) (Gowasu)
Princess Principal (2017) (Horikawa Kou (episode 4–5))
Layton Mystery Tanteisha: Katori no Nazotoki File (2018) (Mustafa Fullhold) (first voice)

Film
Blue Exorcist: The Movie (2012) (Hearing Officer)
Ghost in the Shell: Arise (2013) (Kasuga)

Video games

Tokusatsu
Shuriken Sentai Ninninger (2015) (Youkai Otoroshi (episode 18))

Dubbing roles

Live-action
Kevin Dunn
Samantha Who? (Howard Newly)
Transformers (Ron Witwicky)
Transformers: Revenge of the Fallen (Ron Witwicky)
Transformers: Dark of the Moon (Ron Witwicky)
Mum Jokmok
Ong-Bak: Muay Thai Warrior (Humlae/George)
The Bodyguard (Wong Kom)
Tom-Yum-Goong (Sergeant Mark)
Tom Yum Goong 2 (Sergeant Mark)
2 Fast 2 Furious (2006 TV Asahi edition) (Detective Whitworth (Mark Boone Junior))
50 First Dates (Ula (Rob Schneider))
The 6th Day (Hank Morgan (Michael Rapaport))
8mm (Eddie Poole (James Gandolfini))
Alice Through the Looking Glass (Humpty Dumpty)
American Splendor (Harvey Pekar (Paul Giamatti))
Atomic Blonde (Eric Gray (Toby Jones))
Beautiful Days (Pong Da-roo)
Casablanca (2013 Star Channel edition) (Captain Louis Renault (Claude Rains))
Coco Before Chanel (Étienne Balsan (Benoît Poelvoorde))
Con Air (2000 TV Asahi edition) (Mike "Baby-O" O'Dell (Mykelti Williamson))
Cop Out (Hunsaker (Kevin Pollak))
Crazy Heart (Wesley Barnes)
Dead Ahead: The Exxon Valdez Disaster (Don Cornett)
The Dictator (Mr. Lao (Bobby Lee))
Die Hard with a Vengeance (1999 TV Asahi edition) (Charles Weiss (Kevin Chamberlin))
Dragonheart 3: The Sorcerer's Curse (voice of Drago (Ben Kingsley)
Elizabeth I (Robert Cecil (Toby Jones))
End of Days (Albino (Victor Varnado))
Fast & Furious (Arturo Braga / Ramon Campos (John Ortiz))
Final Destination 5 (Dennis Lapman (David Koechner))
Fred Claus (Willie (John Michael Higgins))
The Godfather (2008 Blu-ray edition) (Peter Clemenza (Richard S. Castellano))
Hancock (Red Parker (Eddie Marsan))
Harry Potter and the Deathly Hallows – Part 2 (Bogrod)
Harry's Law (Richard Cross (Jason Alexander))
His New Job (Film Extra (Ben Turpin))
Imagine That (Dante D'Enzo (Martin Sheen))
Infernal Affairs III (Hon Sam (Eric Tsang))
Joey (Howard Peckerman (Ben Falcone))
Kung Fu Dunk (Zhen Wangli (Eric Tsang))
A Life Less Ordinary (2001 TV Asahi edition) (Elliot Zweikel (Stanley Tucci))
Lock, Stock and Two Smoking Barrels (JD (Sting))
Love & Other Drugs (Bruce Jackson (Oliver Platt))
Machete (Padre Benicio Del Toro (Cheech Marin))
The Machine (Thomson (Denis Lawson))
Mad Max Beyond Thunderdome (2015 Supercharger edition) (Master (Angelo Rossitto))
Mad Max: Fury Road (The People Eater (John Howard))
The Man Who Invented Christmas (John Leech (Simon Callow))
The Master (Lancaster Dodd (Philip Seymour Hoffman))
Memento (John Edward "Teddy" Gammell (Joe Pantoliano))
Mighty Joe Young (Garth (Peter Firth))
The Negotiator (2001 TV Asashi edition) (Rudy Timmons (Paul Giamatti))
Pandorum (Leland (Eddie Rouse))
Private Practice (Nick (Michael Badalucco))
Ready Player One (James Halliday / Anorak the All-Knowing (Mark Rylance))
Season of the Witch (Hagamar (Stephen Graham))
Shallow Hal (Mauricio Wilson (Jason Alexander))
Snatch (2017 Blu-Ray edition) ("Brick Top" Pulford (Alan Ford))
Star Wars: Episode III – Revenge of the Sith (General Grievous)
Suits (Stan Jacobson (John Billingsley))
The Taking of Pelham 123 (Phil Ramos (Luis Guzmán))
The Transporter (Mr. Kwai (Ric Young))

Animation
Adventure Time (Duke of Nuts) 
Cars 2 (Tomber)
Chuggington (Irving)
Dr. Dolittle (Male Pigeon)
Dr. Dolittle 2 (Possum)
Finding Nemo (Nigel)
The Grim Adventures of Billy & Mandy (Boogey Man)
Billy & Mandy's Big Boogey Adventure (Boogey Man)
Hotel Transylvania (Quasimodo)
The Incredibles (Edna Mode)
Incredibles 2 (Edna Mode)
The Lion King 1½ (Doc)
The Little Mermaid II: Return to the Sea (Scuttle)
Planes: Fire & Rescue (Maru)
Queer Duck: The Movie (Bi-Polar Bear)
Ratchet & Clank (Chairman Drek)
Robinson Crusoe (Scrubby)
Robots (Mr. Gunk)
Spider-Man (Mac Gargan)
Spider-Man and His Amazing Friends (Mac Gargan)
Star Wars: The Clone Wars (General Grievous)
Tinker Bell and the Secret of the Wings (Dewey)
Transformers: Animated (Dirt Boss)
Turbo (Kim-Ly)
Yin Yang Yo! (Carl)
Zou (Grandpa)

References

External links

1950 births
2018 deaths
Deaths from cancer in Japan
Deaths from esophageal cancer
Japanese male stage actors
Japanese male video game actors
Japanese male voice actors
Male voice actors from Gifu Prefecture
20th-century Japanese male actors
21st-century Japanese male actors